Sliač Air Base  or, historically, Letisko Tri Duby (literally, "The Three Oaks Airport") is a military airport in central Slovakia situated between the towns of Zvolen and Banská Bystrica and near the spa town of Sliač. The airport has one runway which is 2,400 m long (18/36). The airport is used only by the military since October 2021, when the airport has been closed to all civilian traffic. In 2022, the airport operator company Letisko Sliač a.s. went into liquidation and all airport equipment was sold.

History
The "Tri Duby Airport" played an important role during the Slovak National Uprising in 1944 when it became the most important airport of the Anti-Fascism in Slovakia. Between September 6 and October 25, 1944, the airport was being used as the main base of the Slovak Insurgent Air Force but because of the advancing German units, it later had to be evacuated. While the territory controlled by the Slovak rebels was being encircled by the German forces, "Tri Duby" and the nearby Zolná airport were the main gateways to the rest of the world. In addition to the significant Soviet aid to Slovakia, the United States, too, were sending in supplies and OSS operatives through "Tri Duby", and these flights were also used to evacuate American aeronauts liberated from the German POW camps.

The airport changed its name from "Tri Duby" to Sliač in 1945. 
Following the Prague Spring in 1968, the airfield became a base for the Soviet Union's air forces, which belonged to relations and Sliač as a fighter-bomber and surveillance base here until 1990.

In 2009, it was closed for a major reconstruction project financed in part by NATO and the EU. It was reopened for military use in May 2011, and for civilian use in June 2011. Since October 2021, the airport has been closed to all civilian traffic. The airport operator company Letisko Sliač a.s. went bankrupt in 2022. Sliač Airport operated only summer charter flights to popular sea resort destinations in Bulgaria, Turkey, Greece and Egypt.

Statistics

Passenger throughput and operations since 2013:

References

External links

Official website

Airports in Slovakia
Slovak airbases
20th-century architecture in Slovakia
Military of Slovakia